Capnia lacustra, also known as the Lake Tahoe benthic stonefly, is a species of insect in the family Capniidae. It was first described by S.G. Jewett in 1965. It belongs to the family Capniidae and is the only stonefly known to spend its entire adult life underwater.

Description 
Capnia lacustra is a yellow-ish stonefly up to 5.5mm long that lacks both wings and external gills. It has long, filamentous antennae, paired abdominal cerci, and large compound eyes.

Natural history

Life cycle and behavior 
Unlike other stoneflies, Capnia lacustra adults do not leave the water to lay eggs. They have a univoltine life cycle and have been shown to exhibit facultative viviparity. Researchers have observed two distinct cohorts of Capnia lacustra: one with viviparous females that develop eggs in the fall and one with oviparous females that develop eggs in the spring. Genetic testing has shown that neither cohort is its own distinct species. In viviparous individuals, eggs have been observed in many parts of the body, including the head.

Habitat and distribution 
Capnia lacustra is endemic to Lake Tahoe, which spans the border of Nevada and California. Specimens have been collected in both states at depths of 200-899 feet but are most commonly found in plant beds up to 350 feet below the lake's surface.

Conservation status 
Since the 1960's, Capnia lacustra density has decreased at multiple known sites. This could be related to declines in algae in the genus Chara, which makes up a significant part of their habitat.

References 

Plecoptera
Insects described in 1965
Insects of the United States
Aquatic insects